Quo vadis? is a Latin phrase meaning "Where are you going?".

Quo vadis may also refer to:

Film and television
 Quo Vadis?, a 1901 French film directed by Lucien Nonguet and Ferdinand Zecca
 Quo Vadis (1913 film), an Italian film directed by Enrico Guazzoni
 Quo Vadis (1924 film) an Italian film directed by Gabriellino d'Annunzio and Georg Jacoby
  Quo Vadis (1951 film) an American film directed by Mervyn LeRoy
  Quo Vadis (2001 film) a Polish film directed by Jerzy Kawalerowicz
 Quo Vadis? (miniseries), a 1985 miniseries directed by Franco Rossi
 Quo Vadis, Aida?, a 2020 film directed by Jasmila Žbanić
 "Quo Vadis?", a 2001 episode of the American television series ER

Music
 Quo Vadis (band), a Canadian metal band
 Quo Vadis (Dyson), a cycle of poems  1936-45
 Quo Vadis (Nowowiejski), a 1909 German-language oratorio by Feliks Nowowiejski
 Quo Vadis, a 1947 composition by Sir George Dyson
 "Quo Vadis", a 1994 song by the Australian band Hoodoo Gurus, on the Crank album
 "Quo Vadis", a 1995 song by the Austrian band Imperio
 "Quo Vadis", a 2015 song by the American Band Lower Dens, on the Escape from Evil album

Other uses
 Quo Vadis (automobile), a French automobile produced from 1921 to 1923
 Quo Vadis (horse), an American Quarter Horse mare inducted into the American Quarter Horse Hall of Fame
 Quo Vadis (novel), an 1895 novel by Henryk Sienkiewicz
 Quo Vadis (restaurant), a restaurant and private club in Soho, London
 Quo Vadis (New York restaurant), a restaurant in New York City that operated from 1946 to 1984

 Quo Vadis (video game), a 1984 video game for the Commodore 64
 Quo Vadis Entertainment Center, a former cinema in Westland, Michigan

See also
 Church of Domine Quo Vadis, a common name for the Church of St Mary in Palmis, Italy
 Domine quo vadis?, a 1602 painting by Annibale Carracci
 "Quo Vadis, Capt. Chandler?", a 1975 episode of the American television series M*A*S*H
 Quo Vadimus, a 2000 episode of the American television series, Sports Night